Jürg Amann (born in Winterthur on July 2, 1947; died on May 5, 2013 in Zurich) was a Swiss author and dramatist. He has written radio plays, a biography of Robert Walser, and other works.

Awards
1982 Ingeborg Bachmann Prize
1983 Conrad-Ferdinand-Meyer-Preis

Bibliography

German
 Das Symbol Kafka. Bern 1974
 Die Korrektur. Wien 1977
 Hardenberg. Romantische Erzählung nach dem Nachlass des Novalis. Aarau 1978
 Verirren oder Das plötzliche Schweigen des Robert Walser. Aarau 1978
 Die Kunst des wirkungsvollen Abgangs. Aarau 1979
 Die Baumschule. Berichte aus dem Réduit. München 1982
 Büchners Lenz. Wien 1983
 Nachgerufen. München 1983
 Ach, diese Wege sind sehr dunkel. München 1985. Enthält drei Stücke: Ach, diese Wege sind sehr dunkel, Büchners Lenz, Die deutsche Nacht.
 Patagonien. München 1985
 Robert Walser. Auf der Suche nach einem verlorenen Sohn. München 1985; Zürich 2006, 
 Fort. Eine Brieferzählung. München 1987
 Nach dem Fest. München 1988. Enthält 3 Stücke: Nach dem Fest, Der Traum des Seiltänzers vom freien Fall, Die Korrektur.
 Der Rücktritt. Eine nationale Tragödie. Zelg-Wolfhalden 1989
 Tod Weidigs. Acht Erzählungen. München 1989
 Der Vater der Mutter und Der Vater des Vaters. Düsseldorf 1990
 Der Anfang der Angst. Aus einer glücklichen Kindheit. Düsseldorf 1991
 Widerschein. Bildteppiche von Ilse Abka Prandstetter. Texte von Jürg Amann, Friederike Mayröcker und Julian Schutting. Nachwort von Peter Weiermair, Innsbruck 1991
 Zwei oder drei Dinge. Innsbruck 1993
 Über die Jahre. Innsbruck 1994
 Und über die Liebe wäre wieder zu sprechen. Innsbruck 1994
 Rondo und andere Erzählungen. Zürich 1996
 Schöne Aussicht. Innsbruck 1997
 Ikarus. Zürich 1998
 Iphigenie oder Operation Meereswind. Mit Bildern von Anton Christian, Düsseldorf 1998
 Golomir. Weitra 1999
 Kafka. Wort-Bild-Essay (mit Albert T. Schaefer). Haymon, Innsbruck 2000, 
 Am Ufer des Flusses. Erzählung. Haymon, Innsbruck 2001, 
 Kein Weg nach Rom. Ein Reisebuch (mit Albert T. Schaefer). Eremiten-Presse, Düsseldorf 2001, 
 Mutter töten. Prosa. Haymon, Innsbruck 2003, 
 Sternendrift. Ein amerikanisches Tagebuch (mit Bildern von Silvio Blatter). Eremiten-Presse, Düsseldorf 2003, 
 Wind und Weh. Abschied von den Eltern. Eremiten-Presse, Düsseldorf 2005, 
 Pornographische Novelle. Tisch 7, Köln 2005, 
 Übermalungen-Überspitzungen. Van-Gogh-Variationen (mit Urs Amann). Haymon, Innsbruck 2005, 
 Zimmer zum Hof. Erzählungen. Haymon, Innsbruck 2006, 
 Mehr bedarfs nicht: 12 mal beste deutsche Gedichte, München Piper Verlag 2006   
 Pekinger Passion. Arche, Zürich 2008, 
 Nichtsangst. Fragmente auf Tod und Leben. Haymon, Innsbruck 2008, 
 Die kalabrische Hochzeit. Roman. Zürich 2009, 
 Die Reise zum Horizont. Novelle. Haymon, Innsbruck 2010, 
 Der Kommandant. Monolog. Arche, Zürich 2011, 
 Die Briefe der Puppe. Nimbus, Wädenswil 2011, 
 Letzte Lieben. Arche, Zürich 2011, 
 Ein Lied von Sein und Schein. Nimbus, Wädenswil 2012, 
 Wohin denn wir. Roman. Haymon, Innsbruck 2012, 
 Vater, warum hast du mich verlassen. Arche, Zürich 2013, 
 Die erste Welt. Nimbus, Wädenswil 2013,

English translations

References

External links 
 
 

1947 births
2013 deaths
People from Winterthur
Swiss writers in German
Swiss dramatists and playwrights
Male dramatists and playwrights
Swiss male writers
Swiss radio writers
Ingeborg Bachmann Prize winners
20th-century dramatists and playwrights
20th-century male writers